Enrico Colli, vulgo Paor (11 December 1896 – 28 May 1982), was an Italian cross-country skier who competed in the 1924 Winter Olympics. He was born and died in Cortina d'Ampezzo. In 1924 he finished ninth in the 50 kilometre competition and twelfth in the 18 kilometre event. His younger brother Vincenzo and his nephew Ilio were also notable skiers.

Further results were:
 1920: 1st, Italian men's championships of cross-country skiing, 18 km
 1922: 1st, Italian men's championships of cross-country skiing, 18 km
 1923: 1st, Italian men's championships of cross-country skiing, 18 km
 1925:
 1st, Italian men's championships of cross-country skiing, 50 km
 1st, Italian men's championships of cross-country skiing, 18 km

References

External links
 

1896 births
1982 deaths
Italian male cross-country skiers
Olympic cross-country skiers of Italy
Cross-country skiers at the 1924 Winter Olympics
People from Cortina d'Ampezzo
Presidents of the Organising Committees for the Olympic Games
Sportspeople from the Province of Belluno